Arthur Cormack  (Scottish Gaelic: Art MacCarmaig; born 1965) is a Scottish Gaelic singer and musician from Portree, Isle of Skye and was educated at Portree High School.

Music

Cormack started competing in Gaelic singing competitions when he was 8 and competing at Mods when he was 11. He won the coveted gold medal at the Motherwell Mòd in 1983 at the age of 18, the youngest individual ever to do so.

He is part of the Gaelic supergroup Cliar and he also runs his own Macmeanmna label and continues to guest star on the albums of Blair Douglas. At the 2011 Scots Trad Music Awards, Cormack received the "Hamish Henderson Services to Traditional Music Award".

Gaelic

Cormack is a strong advocate for the Scottish Gaelic language. In 2009 he was appointed as the chairman of Bòrd na Gàidhlig, having been the organization's interim chairman since the previous year, as well as Chief Executive of Fèisean nan Gàidheal for many years.  He was a proactive chairman, often taking to internet forums to counteract anti-Gaelic sentiment.  He stepped down in March 2012. He was also formerly on the Board of Directors of Eden Court Theatre in Inverness and the Scottish Arts Council.

Cormack was appointed Officer of the Order of the British Empire (OBE) in the 2015 New Year Honours for services to Gaelic education.

Personal life
Cormack lives in Portree with his wife Shona. They have three children, Ruairidh, Eilidh and Iain. Eilidh and Ruairidh are both also singers, having won the women's gold medal and men's Traditional gold medal at the Inverness Mòd in 2014 respectively. Ruairidh also won the men's gold medal at the Dunoon Mòd in 2018. Eilidh is also a member of Scottish traditional band, Sian.

Discography

 Nuair a Bha mi Òg (1984)
 Ruith na Gaoithe (1989)
 Buanas (2018)

With Cliar
 Cliar
 Gun Tamh
 Grinn Grinn
 Lasair Dhe

External links
Arthur Cormack profile at Footstompin
Arthur Cormack singing Solus m’Aigh
Macmeanmna record label (gaelicmusic.com)

References

1965 births
Living people
Scottish Gaelic singers
People from the Isle of Skye
Officers of the Order of the British Empire
People educated at Portree High School